Nancy Hardin Rogers (born September 18, 1948) is an American lawyer, author, and former Attorney General of Ohio, a former  Dean of the Ohio State University Moritz College of Law and the current holder of the Michael E. Moritz Chair in Alternative Dispute Resolution at the Moritz College of Law.

Education 
Rogers received her B.A. with highest distinction from the University of Kansas in 1969 and her J.D. from Yale Law School in 1972.

Career 
Rogers clerked for U.S. District Judge Thomas D. Lambros in Cleveland and worked at the Cleveland Legal Aid Society.

Rogers joined the faculty of the Ohio State University College of Law in 1975. She focused her studies on alternative dispute resolution, publishing a large number of journal articles and books, and she helped found the Ohio State Journal on Dispute Resolution, which is an official publication of the American Bar Association.

On January 6, 2007, Rogers became the President of the Association of American Law Schools.  Rogers was also a member of the Ohio Supreme Court Advisory Committee on Dispute Resolution since its inception in 1989, until 2005.

On May 28, 2008, Governor Ted Strickland named Rogers as Attorney General, replacing Marc Dann. Rogers did not seek the position when it was up for reelection in November 2008 and returned to the Moritz faculty following the election.

Books

See also
List of female state attorneys general in the United States

References

External links
Nancy H. Rogers Profile
AALS nomination memo

Living people
University of Kansas alumni
Yale Law School alumni
Ohio State University faculty
Moritz College of Law faculty
Deans of law schools in the United States
Women deans (academic)
Ohio Democrats
Ohio Attorneys General
American academic administrators
American women legal scholars
1948 births